Lasalgaon is a census town in Nashik District in the Indian state of Maharashtra.

Geography

It has an average elevation of 581 metres (1906 feet).

Demographics

 India census, Lasalgaon had a population of 25,525. Males constitute 52% of the population and females 48%. Lasalgaon has an average literacy rate of 77%, higher than the national average of 59.5%: male literacy is 82%, and female literacy is 72%. In Lasalgaon, 11% of the population is under 6 years of age.

Onion Market

Lasalgaon has a prominent onion market. Coordinates: 20° 8'27.74"N,  74°13'24.44"E. The onions from Lasalgaon Market are transported to many places in India and exported to many countries in the world. The Bhabha Atomic Research Centre (BARC) processes onions to keep them fresh for a long time. Lasalgaon is famous for Wine Grapes. Vinchur, which is about 5 km from Lasalgaon, is also known as "Wine Manufacturing city". National Horticultural Research and Development Foundation Lasalgaon ( NHRDF ) developed varieties of Onion and Garlic in its center. The NHRDF under its development program produces and distributes quality seed of Onion and Garlic to the farmers as a service.

Lasalgaon is also famous for Ahilyadevi Holkar's fort located in the center of the city built in the 17th century.

Lasalgaon railway station is available for the transportation of daily commuters, businessmen and many others towards Nashik, Mumbai and Manmad.

References

Cities and towns in Nashik district